Yevgeny Mironov may refer to:
 Yevgeny Mironov (politician) (born 1945), Soviet politician
 Yevgeniy Mironov (born 1949), Soviet shot putter
 Yevgeny Mironov (actor) (born 1966), Soviet and Russian actor